Jefferson County is a county located in the Big Bend region in the northern part of the U.S. state of Florida. As of the 2020 census, the population was 14,510. Its county seat is Monticello.

Jefferson County is part of the Tallahassee, FL Metropolitan Statistical Area but is the 3rd most rural county in Florida. There are no traffic signals within the entire county.

History
Jefferson County was created in 1827.  It was named for Thomas Jefferson, third president of the United States, who had died the year before the county's establishment.

Forts of Jefferson County
 Fort Roger Jones (1839), Aucilla (Ocilla Ferry), north of US 90.
 Fort Noel (1839–1842), south of Lamont on the Aucilla River, six miles (10 km) northwest of Fort Pleasant in Taylor County. Also known as Fort Number Three (M).
 Camp Carter (1838), near Waukeenah.
 Fort Welaunee (1838), a settlers' fort on the Welaunee Plantation near Wacissa. Fort Gamble (1839–1843) was later established here.
 Fort Aucilla (1843), two miles (3 km) south-east of Fort Gamble, southwest of Lamont, between the Aucilla and Wacissa Rivers. Also spelled Ocilla.
 Fort Wacissa (1838), a settlers' fort located south of Wacissa on the Wacissa River, west of Cabbage Grove.

Geography

Jefferson County is the only county in Florida which borders both the state of Georgia and the Gulf of Mexico.

Adjacent counties
 Thomas County, Georgia - north
 Brooks County, Georgia - northeast
 Madison County - east
 Taylor County - southeast
 Wakulla County - southwest
 Leon County - west

National protected area
 St. Marks National Wildlife Refuge (part)

Water Bodies
 Aucilla River
 Lake Miccosukee
 Wacissa River
 Gulf of Mexico

Demographics

2020 census
Note: the US Census treats Hispanic/Latino as an ethnic category. This table excludes Latinos from the racial categories and assigns them to a separate category. Hispanics/Latinos can be of any race.

As of the 2020 United States census, there were 14,510 people, 5,770 households, and 3,761 families residing in the county.

2010 census
As of the census of 2010, there were 14,761 people, 5,646 households, and 3,798 families residing in the county.  The population density was 25 people per square mile (8/km2).  There were 5,251 housing units at an average density of 9 per square mile (3/km2).  The racial makeup of the county was 60.4% White, 36.2% Black or African American, 0.30% Native American, 0.40% Asian, 0.0% Pacific Islander, 1.50% from other races, and 1.30% from two or more races.  3.70% of the population were Hispanic or Latino of any race.

There were 5,646 households, out of which 26.9% had individuals under the age of 18 living with them, 47.30% were married couples living together, 15.10% had a female householder with no husband present, and 32.70% were non-families. 28.1% of all households were made up of individuals, and 10.6% had someone living alone who was 65 years of age or older.  The average household size was 2.38 and the average family size was 2.89.

In the county, the population was spread out, with 18.6% under the age of 18, 8.20% from 18 to 24, 25.0% from 25 to 44, 32.30% from 45 to 64, and 16.5% who were 65 years of age or older.  The median age was 44.1 years. For every 100 females, there were 109.6 males.  For every 100 females age 18 and over, there were 110.00 males age 18 and over.

The following income information is from the 2000 census. The median income for a household in the county was $32,998, and the median income for a family was $40,407. Males had a median income of $26,271 versus $25,748 for females. The per capita income for the county was $17,006.  About 13.30% of families and 17.10% of the population were below the poverty line, including 21.70% of those under age 18 and 17.00% of those age 65 or over.

Government and politics

Jefferson County was one of only a handful of counties in the Florida Panhandle that usually favored the Democratic Party; in recent elections it is trending toward the Republicans. In 2008, Barack Obama won it by a smaller margin than John Kerry had in the 2004 presidential race, one of the few non-Ozark, non-Appalachian, or non-Arizona counties to do so. 

In 2016 it flipped and Donald Trump won the county. In 2018, it voted for both the winning Republican candidates in the governor's race (Ron DeSantis) and the Senate race (Rick Scott).

Education

Jefferson County Schools is the school district of the county. It operates public schools, including Jefferson County Middle / High School.

Library
Jefferson County's library is the R.J. Bailar Public Library, a member of the Wilderness Coast Public Libraries Cooperative. Wilderness Coast Public Libraries.

Transportation

Railroads
The sole existing railroad line is a CSX line once owned by the Seaboard Air Line Railroad that was used by Amtrak's Sunset Limited until 2005, when the service was truncated to New Orleans by Hurricane Katrina. No Amtrak trains stopped anywhere in Jefferson County.

Major highways

  Interstate 10 is the main west-to-east interstate highway in the county, and serves as the unofficial dividing line between northern and southern Jefferson County. It contains three interchanges within the county; the first being SR 59 in Lloyd (Exit 217), the second at US 19 in Drifton (Exit 225), and the third south of Aucilla at CR 257 (Exit 233). Beyond this point I-10 runs through Madison County.
  US 19 is the westernmost north-south US highway in the county. It enters from southwestern Madison County as the Georgia-Florida Parkway in a concurrency with US 27, then breaks away from US 27 in Capps to run straight north through Monticello where it encounters a traffic circle with US 90 around the historic Monticello Courthouse. North of the city it runs through the State of Georgia.
  US 27 is another north-south US highway in the county. It enters from Madison County in a concurrency with US 19, but unlike US 19 breaks away at Capps and runs west toward Tallahassee
  SR 59 is the westernmost north–south highway in Jefferson County and is the only roadway connection between U.S. 90 (at its intersection in Leon County) to the southernmost east–west route through Jefferson County, U.S. Route 98.
  US 90 was the main west-to-east highway in the county, until it was surpassed by I-10. It enters the county from Leon County twice, the second time from a causeway over the southern end of Lake Miccosukee, and eventually enters Monticello in a traffic circle with US 19. East of the city, it curves southeast through rural Jefferson County, then passes north of Aucilla before crossing the Madison County Line at a bridge over the Aucilla River.
  US 98 is the southernmost east–west route running through the Conservation Areas of the Gulf of Mexico from Wakulla to Taylor Counties. The sole major intersection is with SR 59.
  US 221 is the easternmost US highway in the county, running south and north through the northeastern portion of Jefferson County, including Ashville before crossing the Georgia State Line.

Communities

City
 Monticello

Census-designated places
 Aucilla
 Lamont
 Lloyd
 Wacissa
 Waukeenah

Other unincorporated communities

 Alma
 Ashville
 Capps
 Casa Blanco
 Cody
 Dills
 Drifton
 Fanlew
 Festus
 Fincher
 Jarrott
 Limestone
 Lois
 Montivilla
 Nash
 Thomas City

See also
 National Register of Historic Places listings in Jefferson County, Florida

References

External links

Government links
 Jefferson County Home Page
 Jefferson County R.J. Bailar Public Library
 Jefferson County Economic Development Council
 Jefferson County Tourist Development Council
 Chamber of Commerce

Constitutional Offices
 Jefferson County Board of County Commissioners
 Jefferson County Supervisor of Elections
 Jefferson County Property Appraiser
 Jefferson County Sheriff's Office
 Jefferson County Tax Collector

Jefferson County Schools
 Public School System
 Jefferson County School District
 Private School System
 Aucilla Christian Academy

Judicial Branch
 Jefferson County Clerk of Courts
  Public Defender, 2nd Judicial Circuit of Florida serving  Franklin, Gadsden, Jefferson, Leon, Liberty, and Wakulla counties
  Office of the State Attorney, 2nd Judicial Circuit of Florida
  Circuit and County Court for the 2nd Judicial Circuit of Florida

Special Districts
 Suwannee River Water Management District
 Northwest Florida Water Management District

 
Florida counties
1827 establishments in Florida Territory
North Florida
Populated places established in 1827
Tallahassee metropolitan area